Kaza, also spelled Kaze, Karze, Karzey, is a town and the subdivisional headquarters of the remote Spiti Valley in the western Himalayas in the Lahaul and Spiti district of the northern Indian state of Himachal Pradesh. Spiti is a high altitude or cold desert having close similarities to the neighbouring Tibet and Ladakh regions in terms of terrain, climate and the Buddhist culture.

Description
The town is divided into the old, as Kaza Khas and new as Kaza Soma sections. The new town contains the administrative buildings. The Tangyud (Tang-rGyud) Gompa dates to the early 14th century and is built like a fortified castle with massive slanted mud walls and battlements with vertical red ochre and white vertical stripes. It is on the edge of a deep canyon and overlooking the town of Kaza, 4 km from the town. Approaching it from the south one sees Kyu-ling (Skyid-gling), the stately palace of the Nono (king) on the other side of the river.

Access
Kaza is overlooked by high mountain ridges on the NE and SW sides. The Spiti River runs from NW to SE past Kaza. Kaza has two access routes: one from Kinnaur valley and  the other from the Lahaul valley. The route via NH 505 through Kinnaur is open throughout the year, except for occasional short periods resulting from landslides or heavy snowfall. This road, starting from Shimla, follows the Sutlej river unto a little beyond Poo, thereafter turning northwards to follow the Spiti river all the way to Kaza. It remains closed during winter months, normally from October end to June due to heavy snowfall on both the passes. Kaza is one of the coldest towns in India. The temperature varies greatly in different seasons as well as within a day. January is the coldest month of the year with an average temperature of -25 °C, while July is the hottest month with an average temperature of 10 °C.

Festivals & Tourism
Kaza is known for its colorful festivals and the ruins of the ancient Sakya Tangyud Monastery, located near village Komik,14 km from Kaza. It is also popular with tourists and adventure seekers during the period of June, July and August and September because of its central location and connections to the rest of the valley (Connects to Leh-Manali Highway via Kunzum Pass). This central location also makes Kaza an ideal base camp for trekking, mountaineering, and tours directed to other parts of the valley.

The prominent festivals celebrated in Kaza are Ladarcha (mid-August), Spiti Losar (around November), and Dachang (around February). Kaza's Ladarcha fair is the most renowned fair of Kaza; it indicates the termination of summer season in the region.

Previously, Ladarcha fair used to be celebrated  in Kibbar maidan in Spit in the month of July where traders from  Ladakh, Rampur Busher and Spiti meet in this fair to barter their produce. Due to closure of Tibetan traders, this fair is  now being celebrated at Kaza, the headquarters of Spiti Sub Division in the 3rd week of August. A large number of visitors  and traders from Kullu/ Lahaul/ Kinnaur meet there. It has now  become a conference of cultures of Spiti, Ladakh & Kinnaur as also of the Indian plains.

It sends postal letters to and receives postal articles from Kaza post office.

Monasteries

Sakya Tangyud monastery; built in the year 2009, Sakya Tangyud monastery is situated in Kaza town of Spiti Valley.

Facilities

In 2022, the Himachal Pradesh government constructed an indoor gym at a cost of Rs. 10 lakhs (1 million).  With development of the region over the past few years, local residents get less physical activity.  They report that lifestyle diseases such as heart diseases, blood pressure and diabetes have made an appearance.  The gym is expected to provide an alternative over addition to gadgets and drugs for the youth.  Tourists may also use the gym to adapt to high-altitude.  The gym is said to be the highest in the world, though this is yet to be verified.

The only petrol bunk in Spiti is located in Kaza.  The town has a Community Health Centre and a Police Station.  Mobile internet services are provided by BSNL, Airtel 4G and Jio 4G.

Rangrik airbase 

Indian Military is constructing an airbase at Rangrik (7 km northwest of Kaza & 100 km west of  Kaurik on LAC) in Spiti valley which will also cater for the civilian flights. It was announced in the January 2023, and it will be completed by end of 2024.

Highways

Hanle-Kaza-Tabo Road is being construction by the BRO under Indo-China Border Roads (ICBR) scheme. 

NH505 connects Kaza to Manali in southwest, and Kaurik, Sumdo, Pooh & Tabo in east. Kaza-Pooh-Tabo-Shimla route is open whole year, but the Manali-Kaza route is closed for 7 winter months every year during which Kunzum Pass (15,000 ft) is closed. NHAI is planning to construct a tunnel under the Kunzum Pass to provide all-weather connectivity between Manali and Spiti valley.

See also 

 Indo-China Border Roads

References

Bibliography
 Ciliberto, Jonathan. (2013). "Six Weeks in the Spiti Valley". Circle B Press. 2013. Atlanta. 
 Francke, A. H. (1914, 1926). Antiquities of Indian Tibet. Two Volumes. Calcutta. 1972 reprint: S. Chand, New Delhi.
 Handa, O. C. (1987). Buddhist Monasteries in Himachal Pradesh. Indus Publishing Company, New Delhi. .
 Kapadia, Harish. (1999). Spiti: Adventures in the Trans-Himalaya. Second Edition. (1st edition 1996). Indus Publishing Company, New Delhi. .

External links
 
 Spiti Tourist Places
 Kaza Hill Station
 Parasol Retreat KAZA
 Kaza:A complete travel guide

Cities and towns in Lahaul and Spiti district
Lahaul and Spiti district